Godków may refer to the following places in Poland:
Godków, Lower Silesian Voivodeship (south-west Poland)
Godków, West Pomeranian Voivodeship (north-west Poland)